Hinrich Lehmann-Grube (21 December 1932 – 6 August 2017) was a German politician. He served as Mayor of Leipzig from 1990 through 1998. He was a member of the Social Democratic Party of Germany. He was born in Königsberg (present day Kaliningrad, Russia).

Death
Lehmann-Grube died in Leipzig of cancer on 6 August 2017 at the age of 84.

See also
 List of Social Democratic Party of Germany politicians

References

External links

 Hinrich Lehmann-Grube im Leipzig-Lexikon
 Dr. Hinrich Lehmann-Grube, Sachsen (Leipzig), zeitzeugenbuero.de
 Ralf Geißler: Ein Neubeginn in Leipzig: Hinrich Lehmann-Grube: vom BRD- zum DDR-Politiker, Sendemanuskript, Deutschlandradio Kultur, 06. Juni 2011

1932 births
2017 deaths
Mayors of Leipzig
Politicians from Königsberg
Social Democratic Party of Germany politicians